The Ogden-Clearfield, UT Metropolitan Statistical Area, as defined by the United States Office of Management and Budget, is an area consisting of four counties in north central Utah, anchored by the cities of Ogden and Clearfield. As of the 2010 census, the MSA had a population of 547,184. On February 28, 2013 the White House released a Bulletin Revising delineations of CSA's and MSA's, which led to the addition of Box Elder County to the Ogden-Clearfield Metropolitan Statistical Area, bringing the MSA population (using 2010 census numbers) to 597,159.

Counties
Davis
Morgan
Weber
Box Elder

Communities

Bear River City
Bountiful
Brigham City
Centerville
Clearfield
Clinton
Corinne
Croydon (unincorporated)
Deweyville
Eden (unincorporated)
Elwood
Farmington
Farr West
Fielding
Fruit Heights
Garland
Harrisville
Honeyville
Hooper
Howell

Huntsville
Kaysville
Layton
Liberty (unincorporated)
Mantua
Marriott-Slaterville
Monte Verde (unincorporated)
Morgan
Mountain Green (unincorporated)
Nordic Valley (unincorporated)
North Ogden
North Salt Lake
Ogden
Perry
Peterson (unincorporated)
Plain City
Pleasant View
Plymouth
Portage
Reese (unincorporated)
Richville (unincorporated)

Riverdale
Roy
Snowville
South Ogden
South Weber
Stoddard (unincorporated)
Sunset
Syracuse
Taylor (unincorporated)
Tremonton
Uintah
Warren (unincorporated)
Washington Terrace
West Bountiful
West Haven
West Point
West Weber (unincorporated)
Willard
Woods Cross

Demographics
As of the census of 2000, there were 442,646 people, 138,945 households, and 110,557 families residing within the MSA. The racial makeup of the MSA was 90.32% White, 1.21% African American, 0.66% Native American, 1.40% Asian, 0.22% Pacific Islander, 4.17% from other races, and 2.02% from two or more races. Hispanic or Latino of any race were 8.57% of the population.

The median income for a household in the MSA was $49,338, and the median income for a family was $53,806. Males had a median income of $39,834 versus $24,553 for females. The per capita income for the MSA was $18,479.

See also
Utah census statistical areas
Wasatch Front

References

 
Wasatch Front
Metropolitan areas of Utah